"When You Say You Love Me" is a song by Australian vocal group Human Nature, released as the first single from their fourth studio album, Walk the Tightrope (2004). It was written by Darren Hayes from Savage Garden and Rick Nowels, who also produced the track. The song was originally recorded in 2003 by Clay Aiken for his album Measure of a Man. Released on 12 April 2004, the song peaked at number seven in Australia.

Music video
A music video was released to promote the song; with the group on a bus and performing the song at a petrol station.

Track listing
Australian CD single
 "When You Say You Love Me"
 "When You Say You Love Me" (remix)

Charts

Weekly charts

Year-end charts

Certifications

References

2003 songs
2004 singles
Columbia Records singles
Human Nature (band) songs
Pop ballads
Song recordings produced by Rick Nowels
Songs written by Darren Hayes
Songs written by Rick Nowels